Giacinto Provana di Collegno (Turin, 1793 – Baveno, 1856) was an Italian patriot of the Risorgimento period, a friend of Giuseppe Garibaldi. Trained as a geologist, he became a Piedmontese politician and in July 1848 he was appointed Minister of War in the Casati government.

Collegno fought during the Napoleonic Wars, reaching the rank of colonel in an engineering unit. Following his exile from Italy he joined his friend count Annibale Santorre di Rossi de Pomarolo, Count of Santarosa to Greece where they fought in the Greek War of Independence. On 31 March 1825, he was appointed head engineer of the Neokastro garrison which at the time was undergoing a siege by Egyptian troops.

This article includes text translated from its counterpart in the Italian Wikipedia.

Footnotes

References

 

Politicians from Turin
19th-century Italian geologists
Military personnel from Turin
1793 births
1856 deaths
Italian people of the Italian unification
Italian military personnel of the Napoleonic Wars
Italian philhellenes
Philhellenes in the Greek War of Independence